Martin Solomon may refer to:

 Martin K. Solomon, professor of computer science
 Martin M. Solomon (born 1950), American lawyer and politician from New York